The 2017 Open de Cagnes-sur-Mer Alpes-Maritimes was a professional tennis tournament played on outdoor clay courts. It was the twentieth edition of the tournament and part of the 2017 ITF Women's Circuit, offering a total of $100,000 in prize money. It took place in Cagnes-sur-Mer, France, from 8–14 May 2017.

Point distribution

Singles main draw entrants

Seeds 

 1 Rankings as of 1 May 2017

Other entrants 
The following players received wildcards into the singles main draw:
  Tessah Andrianjafitrimo
  Fiona Ferro
  Amandine Hesse
  Chloé Paquet

The following players received entry into the singles main draw by a protected ranking:
  Alexandra Dulgheru

The following players received entry from the qualifying draw:
  Jana Fett
  Elizaveta Kulichkova
  Alizé Lim
  Katarina Zavatska

Champions

Singles

 Beatriz Haddad Maia def.  Jil Teichmann, 6–3, 6–3

Doubles

 Chang Kai-chen /  Hsieh Su-wei def.  Raluca Olaru /  Renata Voráčová, 7–5, 6–1

External links 
 2017 Open de Cagnes-sur-Mer Alpes-Maritimes at ITFtennis.com
 Official website

2017 in French tennis
2017 ITF Women's Circuit
2017
May 2017 sports events in France